Sir John Cowdery Kendrew,  (24 March 1917 – 23 August 1997) was an English biochemist, crystallographer, and science administrator.  Kendrew shared the 1962 Nobel Prize in Chemistry with Max Perutz, for their work at the Cavendish Laboratory to investigate the structure of heme-containing proteins.

Education and early life
Kendrew was born in Oxford, son of Wilfrid George Kendrew, reader in climatology in the University of Oxford, and Evelyn May Graham Sandburg, art historian. After prep school at the Dragon School in Oxford, he was educated at Clifton College in Bristol, 1930–1936. He attended Trinity College, Cambridge in 1936, as a Major Scholar, graduating in chemistry in 1939. He spent the early months of World War II doing research on reaction kinetics, and then became a member of the Air Ministry Research Establishment, working on radar. In 1940 he became engaged in operational research at the Royal Air Force headquarters; commissioned a squadron leader on 17 September 1941, he was appointed an honorary wing commander on 8 June 1944, and relinquished his commission on 5 June 1945. He was awarded his PhD after the war in 1949.

Research and career
During the war years, he became increasingly interested in biochemical problems, and decided to work on the structure of proteins.

Crystallography
In 1945 he approached Max Perutz in the Cavendish Laboratory in Cambridge. Joseph Barcroft, a respiratory physiologist, suggested he might make a comparative protein crystallographic study of adult and fetal sheep hemoglobin, and he started that work.

In 1947 he became a Fellow of Peterhouse; and the Medical Research Council (MRC) agreed to create a research unit for the study of the molecular structure of biological systems, under the direction of Sir Lawrence Bragg. In 1954 he became a Reader at the Davy-Faraday Laboratory of the Royal Institution in London.

Crystal structure of myoglobin

Kendrew shared the 1962 Nobel Prize for chemistry with Max Perutz for determining the first atomic structures of proteins using X-ray crystallography. Their work was done at what is now the MRC Laboratory of Molecular Biology in Cambridge. Kendrew determined the structure of the protein myoglobin, which stores oxygen in muscle cells. On Saturday 20 October 1962 the award of Nobel prizes to John Kendrew and Max Perutz, and to Crick, Watson, and Wilkins was satirised in a short sketch in the BBC TV programme That Was The Week That Was with the Nobel Prizes being referred to as 'The Alfred Nobel Peace Pools'.

In 1947 the MRC agreed to make a research unit for the Study of the Molecular Structure of Biological Systems. The original studies were on the structure of sheep hemoglobin, but when this work had progressed as far as was possible using the resources then available, Kendrew embarked on the study of myoglobin, a molecule only a quarter the size of the hemoglobin molecule. His initial source of raw material was horse heart, but the crystals thus obtained were too small for X-ray analysis. Kendrew realized that the oxygen-conserving tissue of diving mammals could offer a better prospect, and a chance encounter led to his acquiring a large chunk of whale meat from Peru. Whale myoglobin did give large crystals with clean X-ray diffraction patterns. However, the problem still remained insurmountable, until in 1953 Max Perutz discovered that the phase problem in analysis of the diffraction patterns could be solved by multiple isomorphous replacement — comparison of patterns from several crystals; one from the native protein, and others that had been soaked in solutions of heavy metals and had metal ions introduced in different well-defined positions. An electron density map at 6 angstrom (0.6 nanometre) resolution was obtained by 1957, and by 1959 an atomic model could be built at 2 angstrom (0.2 nm) resolution.

Later career
In 1963, Kendrew became one of the founders of the European Molecular Biology Organization; as well, he founded and was for many years editor-in-chief of the Journal of Molecular Biology. He became Fellow of the American Society of Biological Chemists in 1967 and honorary member of the International Academy of Science, Munich. In 1974, he succeeded in persuading governments to establish the European Molecular Biology Laboratory (EMBL) in Heidelberg and became its first director.  He was knighted in 1974. From 1974 to 1979, he was a Trustee of the British Museum, and from 1974 to 1988 he was successively Secretary General, Vice-President, and President of the International Council of Scientific Unions.

After his retirement from EMBL, Kendrew became President of St John's College at the University of Oxford, a post he held from 1981 to 1987.  In his will, he designated his bequest to St John's College for studentships in science and in music, for students from developing countries.  The Kendrew Quadrangle at St John's College in Oxford, officially opened on 16 October 2010, is named after him.

Kendrew was married to the former Elizabeth Jarvie (née Gorvin) from 1948 to 1956.  Their marriage ended in divorce.  Kendrew was subsequently partners with the artist Ruth Harris. He left no survivors.

A biography of John Kendrew, titled A Place in History: The Biography of John C. Kendrew, by Paul M Wassarman was published by Oxford University Press in March 2020.

Selected Publications by Kendrew

References

Further reading
 John Finch; 'A Nobel Fellow on Every Floor', Medical Research Council 2008, 381 pp, ; this book is all about the MRC Laboratory of Molecular Biology, Cambridge.
 Oxford University Press, page on Paul M. Wassarman, A Place in History, 2020

External links
 
 

1917 births
1997 deaths
Alumni of Trinity College, Cambridge
Commanders of the Order of the British Empire
British crystallographers
English biologists
English biophysicists
English molecular biologists
English Nobel laureates
Fellows of the Royal Society
Foreign associates of the National Academy of Sciences
Knights Bachelor
Members of the European Molecular Biology Organization
Nobel laureates in Chemistry
People educated at Clifton College
People educated at The Dragon School
Scientists from Oxford
Presidents of St John's College, Oxford
Presidents of the British Science Association
Royal Medal winners
Trustees of the British Museum
X-ray crystallography
20th-century biologists
Royal Air Force personnel of World War II
Royal Air Force Volunteer Reserve personnel of World War II
Royal Air Force wing commanders